Ye Jia (born ), is a former Chinese-born Hong Kong professional footballer. He is an all-rounded player who can play as an attacking midfielder or a striker on the field. He is currently the assistant coach of Hong Kong Premier League club Tai Po.

Early life
Ye Jia was born on 1 December 1981 in Shanghai, China. He played for amateur football team Shanghai Tianna in China Amateur Football League in 2002. After a season, another local club Shanghai The 9 bought Shanghai Tianna, turned professional and started to participate in China League Two, so Ye Jia became a professional football player.

Club career

Shanghai The 9
As his first professional team experience, Ye Jia did not contemplate breaking into the first team immediately but looked up to senior players like Ebelio Ordóñez. He always was a substitution player in league matches.

Tai Po
In the 2007–2008 season, Tai Po was the finalist of the FA Cup. Ye scored an important goal for the club against South China and brought the club to the final. This is the first time of the club to be the finalist of the FA Cup.

Tai Po got 3 straight wins against Tuen Mun Progoal, Sheffield United and Pegasus in the 2008–2009 season. As Ye was suspended for the first match, he played as a striker in the next 2 matches, giving 2 assists and a goal for the club. He also scored for the club in the semi-finals of FA Cup against Kitchee and Tai Po got into the final.

In the 2009–2010 season, Ye scored 7 goals in the first 6 matches. Moreover, in the match against Tuen Mun Progoal, he scored 4 goals.

South China
At the beginning of the 2019–20 season, Ye joined South China as an amateur player.

International career
As a Chinese national, according to the FIFA Statues, he became eligible for the Hong Kong national football team following two years of residency in Hong Kong. Hong Kong's coach Tsang Wai Chung selected Ye Jia for the training section before the start of the 2010–11 season.

Career statistics

International
Updated 28 July 2011

Honours
Tai Po
Hong Kong First Division:  2013–14, 2015–16
Hong Kong FA Cup: 2008–09
Hong Kong Senior Shield: 2012–13

References

External links
 Player information on HKFA site
 Player Information on NT Realty Wofoo Tai Po official site (in Chinese)

1981 births
Living people
Footballers from Shanghai
Chinese footballers
Hong Kong footballers
Expatriate footballers in Hong Kong
Hong Kong First Division League players
Hong Kong Premier League players
Tai Po FC players
Chinese expatriate sportspeople in Hong Kong
Hong Kong Rangers FC players
South China AA players
Pudong Zobon players
Hong Kong international footballers
Association football midfielders
Association football forwards
Hong Kong League XI representative players